The 2001 Australian Drivers' Championship was a CAMS sanctioned national motor racing title for drivers of cars conforming to Formula Holden regulations, with the winner awarded the 2001 CAMS Gold Star. This, the 45th Australian Drivers' Championship, was promoted as the 2001 Holden Australian Drivers' Championship.

Rick Kelly dominated the series driving a Birrana Racing Reynard 94D Holden. Kelly won twelve of the 16 races and finished 151 points ahead of runner up Christian Murchison (Reynard 97D Holden), the largest winning points margin in ADC history. Third in the point score was Alan Gurr (Reynard 94D Holden). The four races not won by Kelly were won by Birrana Racing teammates, both former champions making guest appearances. Dual champion Simon Wills took three victories with three-time champion Paul Stokell winning the final race of the season at Winton Motor Raceway.

Teams and drivers

Calendar
The championship was contested over an eight-round series with two races per round.

Points system
Championship points were awarded on a 20–15–12–10–8–6–4–3–2–1 basis for the first ten places in each race.

Championship results

References

External links
 www.formulaholden.com at 1 Dec 2001 via replay.waybackmachine.org
 2001 Race results and points table at www.teamdan.com
 Image of 2001 Champion Rick Kelly at the Phillip Island round

Australian Drivers' Championship
Drivers' Championship
Formula Holden
Australian Drivers